Wengen is a railway station in the car free resort of Wengen in the Bernese Oberland region of Switzerland. The station is on the Wengernalpbahn (WAB), whose trains operate from Lauterbrunnen to Kleine Scheidegg via Wengen. Administratively, the station is in the municipality of Lauterbrunnen in the canton of Bern.

History
The station was opened on 18 April 1892. In 1899 the station was rebuilt and a depot was constructed. In 1905 the station was reconstructed with level platforms, having previously had an angle of 73°. In 1932 the newspaper kiosk was opened, and in 1976 the platforms were reconstructed. The station was substantially rebuilt in 1991, with a freight depot being constructed underneath the passenger station.

In 1910, a new route from Lauterbrunnen to Wengen was opened to replace the more direct but steeper original routing. However the original routing remained in use for freight traffic until 2009, when the track was lifted. The junction between the two routes can still be seen, just to the Lauterbrunnen side of Wengen station.

Operation 
Wengen is a car free resort without road access, and the railway is therefore essential both for passenger access and for the supply of goods. The passenger station has five tracks, four for through trains, and a terminating track facing Lauterbrunnen.

Freight trains run regularly from Lauterbrunnen to Wengen, serving a freight station with its own low level sidings in the basement of the passenger station. Trains carrying building materials such as cement, operate to the far side of the passenger station, where they can be tipped directly into lineside hoppers.

The station is served by the following passenger trains:

Wengen is also the connection to the Wengen–Männlichen aerial cableway that runs to near the summit of the Männlichen mountain.

References

External links 
 
 Wengen station on the Jungfraubahn web site

Railway stations in the canton of Bern
Railway stations in Switzerland opened in 1892